Professor Cillian Ryan is an academic economist and pro vice-chancellor at Nottingham Trent University.

Career
Ryan received his BA and MA in economics from University College Dublin and his Ph.D. from the University of Western Ontario. Prior to his current appointment, he was pro vice-chancellor at De Montfort University, Leicester (2014–2016), and was the founding dean of liberal arts & sciences at the University of Birmingham (2011–2014). Other roles at the University of Birmingham included deputy head of the College of Social Sciences, (2008–2014), head of the European Research Institute (2005–2008), director of the university's Jean Monnet European Centre of Excellence (1998–2014), and holder of the Jean Monnet Chair in European Economics (1998–2014).

Ryan has advised the European Commission, UNCTAD, the WTO and many national governments on matters relating to trade in services, particularly financial services and financial service regulations, ranging from NAFTA in the 1980s to the present day. During the Conservative-Liberal coalition from 2010-2015 he was an advisor to the UK Cabinet Office on the UK Treasury and BIS EU Balance of Competencies Reviews. More recently he has provided advice on a range of post-Brexit trade agreement proposals relating to trade in education services.

He was the chair of the Leicestershire Police Ethics, Integrity and Complaints Committee (2015-2020), a member of the board of the Economics Network, an honorary professor at the University of Birmingham, and has served in a variety of capacities the Higher Education Academy, the European Jean Monnet Network, and the Royal Economics Society (including running the UK Royal Economics Society Easter School from 1992 to 2001).

Research
His edited volumes include:

 "Financial Market Integration and Growth; Structural Change and Economic Dynamics in the European Union " P.J.J Welfens, Ryan, C, (eds). Springer-Verlag Heidelberg, 2011. 
 EU-ASEAN: Facing Economic Globalisation, P.J.J Welfens, Ryan, C, Chirathivat, S, and F Knipping (eds). Springer-Verlag Heidelberg, 2009,  XVI, 246 p. 48 illus., 
 INTEGRATION IN ASIA AND EUROPE: Historical Dimensions, Comparative Analysis and Politico-Economic Dynamics, Chirathivat, S, Knipping, F, Ryan, C and P.J.J Welfens (eds). Springer-Verlag Heidelberg  (2005).

Awards
In 2008 he was the recipient of the EIIW European Economics Science Prize and was elected a Fellow of the Royal Society of the Arts in 2014.

Personal life
Ryan was educated at Synge Street CBS and is the son of the former Irish politician, Richie Ryan.

References

Living people
Irish scholars and academics
People educated at Synge Street CBS
Year of birth missing (living people)
Academics of the University of Birmingham
Academics of Nottingham Trent University
Alumni of University College Dublin
University of Western Ontario alumni